The knockout stage of UEFA Euro 1988 was a single-elimination tournament involving the four teams that qualified from the group stage of the tournament. There were two rounds of matches: a semi-final stage leading to the final to decide the champions. The knockout stage began with the semi-finals on 21 June and ended with the final on 25 June 1988 at the Olympiastadion in Munich. The Netherlands won the tournament with a 2–0 victory over the Soviet Union.

All times Central European Summer Time (UTC+2)

Format
Any game in the knockout stage that was undecided by the end of the regular 90 minutes was followed by thirty minutes of extra time (two 15-minute halves). If scores were still level after 30 minutes of extra time, there would be a penalty shootout (at least five penalties each, and more if necessary) to determine who progressed to the next round. As with every tournament since UEFA Euro 1984, there was no third place play-off.

Qualified teams
The top two placed teams from each of the two groups qualified for the knockout stage.

Bracket

Semi-finals

West Germany vs Netherlands

Soviet Union vs Italy

Final

References

External links

 UEFA Euro 1988 official history

Knockout stage
1988
Knockout stage
Knockout stage
European Championship
Knockout stage